Deyes High School is a coeducational secondary school and sixth form situated in Maghull on the outskirts of Liverpool, England.

History
The school was opened in March 1939 by Sir Peter Meadon, Lancashire's director of education at a cost of £30,000. The school was later named Maghull Deyes Lane County Secondary School before the reorganisation as a comprehensive school in September 1972. A teaching block was extensively damaged by fire in October 1974. The school's swimming pool opened in January 1976, four months later than originally planned and costing around £200,000.

Previously a community school administered by Sefton Metropolitan Borough Council, in October 2011 Deyes High School converted to academy status. The school is now sponsored by the Lydiate Learning Trust.

Buildings 
Deyes High School has seven buildings among its grounds; Lydiate, Molyneux, Unsworth, Sefton, Allen, @Deyes building and the Sixth Form Building.
The Lydiate Building was the first part of the school to be erected and for many years had a large quadrangle in its centre, housing a variety of animals, including peacocks.
The Sefton Building is split into two sections: The newer section houses the Religious Education and History departments, and the other has a small Geography department and the oldest of the Science rooms. 
The Unsworth Building is not just one single structure; there are three buildings around the school with the name.  Departments such as Information Communication Technology, Music, Physical Education and Performing Arts all have a place inside three unified buildings.  The main school hall is situated in the Unsworth building, forming the main part and centre of the school.
The Molyneux building is three storeys high and has the Mathematics, Modern Foreign Languages, and Science departments. The ground floor of the building has two rooms dedicated to Learning Mentors.
The Allen building is the Technology building with one room being used as an ICT room as well. This building was opened in 2003.

The school has just completed the construction of its @ Deyes Building.

Results
Deyes High school has a pupil population of 1444 which is one of the largest in Sefton and also has the largest sixth form in Sefton.

In 2011, Deyes High School achieved its best ever results. The 5 A* - C score at GCSE stood at 87% and including English & Maths at 70%. This totalled an 11% increase in performance over 12 months. Deyes High can proudly say they are a "high performing establishment" providing excellent education with outstanding outcomes.

Notable former pupils
 James Graham St Helens and GB rugby league player.
 Will Sergeant Guitarist for Echo & the Bunnymen
 Les Pattinson Bassist for Echo & the Bunnymen
 Paul Simpson singer for The Wild Swans and keyboard player for Teardrop Explodes
Chris Butler Academy Award nominated and Golden Globe winning filmmaker of Paranorman and Missing Link.

References

External links 
Deyes High School Website
Deyes High Ofsted Report
BBC League Tables
Department for Children, Schools and Families

Secondary schools in the Metropolitan Borough of Sefton
Maghull
Academies in the Metropolitan Borough of Sefton